Bolonchén or Bolonchén de  Rejón   (Bolon Che'e'en in Modern Maya) is a town in the Mexican state of Campeche, about  east from the state capital, Campeche, in Hopelchén Municipality.  the town had a population of 3,975 people. A short distance to the south of Bolonchén are located the caves of Xtacunbilxunan.

Etymology
The name "Bolonchén" means "Nine Wells" in the Maya language, and "de  Rejón" commemorates Manuel Crescencio Rejón, a lawyer who helped draft the 1917 Constitution and who was born here. Previously, the Pueblo was named Bolonchenticul. It was renamed in September 1955 to Balonchén de Rejón . It is also the birthplace of Olegario Molina y Solis, the Governor of Yucatán and Minister de Fomento in the Porfirio Díaz era (1877–1911). In 1833, it was the only pueblo to escape the cholera epidemic. This was due to the efforts of Julian Molina y Bastante (Olegario's grandfather) and the brothers Martinez.

Ruins
The large Bolonchén ruins site of ancient Maya architecture is located just north of the modern town. Most of the carved stone facades of the ancient structures were removed in the 18th through mid−20th centuries for reuse in new construction work. Nonetheless, a few monuments with sculpture and hieroglyphic texts are still visible.

Both the ruins and cave were visited and described briefly by John Lloyd Stephens at the start of the 1840s, but no detailed scholarly examination of the ruins was made until Eric von Euw in 1973 (in part because Stephens and other early visitors failed to note that there were surviving inscriptions).

Climate

References

Populated places in Campeche
Maya sites in Campeche
Maya Classic Period